Manicamp is a commune in the Aisne department in Hauts-de-France in northern France.

Geography
The villages is located in the northwestern part of the commune, on the left bank of the river Ailette, which flows west through the northern part of the commune, then joins the Oise, which forms most of the commune's northern border.

Population

See also
 Communes of the Aisne department

References

Communes of Aisne
Aisne communes articles needing translation from French Wikipedia